Orchestra Wives is a 1942 American musical film by 20th Century Fox starring Ann Rutherford, George Montgomery, and Glenn Miller. The film was the second (and last) film to feature The Glenn Miller Orchestra, and is notable among the many swing era musicals because its plot is more serious and realistic than the insubstantial 
storylines that were typical of the genre. The movie was re-released in 1954 by 20th Century Fox to tie-in with the biopic The Glenn Miller Story.

Synopsis
Connie Ward (Ann Rutherford) is a young woman who on the spur of the moment marries Bill Abbott (George Montgomery), a trumpet player in Gene Morrison's (Glenn Miller) swing band (Miller's character was given a name with initials that matched Miller's so that the band could use their monogrammed stainless-steel music stands). She soon finds herself at odds with the cattiness and petty jealousies of the other band members' spouses, as they accompany their husbands on their cross-country train tour. Her discomfort is exacerbated by a flirtation between Abbott and Jaynie (Lynn Bari), the band's female vocalist. When Ward eventually walks out on Abbott, their split releases so many other tensions among the musicians and their wives, that leader Morrison is forced to break up the orchestra. Ward and the band's pianist Sinjin (Cesar Romero) then work behind the scenes to reunite the band, which also produces a reconciliation between Ward and Abbott (with additional help from Connie's father Grant Mitchell).

Montgomery's trumpet playing on the soundtrack was performed by Johnny Best, Glenn Miller's lead trumpet player.

Songs
Orchestra Wives features a treasure trove of songs by Mack Gordon and Harry Warren, the same team responsible for the hits featured in Miller's first film Sun Valley Serenade (1941). The main production number is "(I've Got a Gal in) Kalamazoo", an analogue of "Chattanooga Choo-Choo" from the first film, that features a folksy vocal and some gutsy tenor sax work by Tex Beneke, backup singing by Marion Hutton with the Modernaires, and a gravity-defying dance sequence by the Nicholas Brothers. This was nominated as Best Music, Original Song in Academy Awards: Harry Warren (music), Mack Gordon (lyrics).

Other songs include the period piece "People Like You and Me", a breakneck performance of "Bugle Call Rag" and the classic romantic ballads "At Last" (originally intended for Sun Valley Serenade) and "Serenade in Blue". The film score uses "At Last" as a musical motif laced throughout the movie in dramatic and romantic scenes. "That's Sabotage" was also written for the movie but was cut from the film. The song was, however, released as a 78 single by Glenn Miller and His Orchestra, and the unused soundtrack recording was featured on various LP compilations of Miller's soundtracks.

Glenn Miller's theme song "Moonlight Serenade" from 1939 also appears over the opening credits.

"Boom Shot", an instrumental composed by Glenn Miller and Billy May for the movie, appears, first on the jukebox in the soda shop, then later when Ann Rutherford and Harry Morgan are shown dancing, but is uncredited on the soundtrack and film credits.

Cast listing

Uncredited performances
Three future stars have uncredited appearances: Jackie Gleason portrays the band's bass player, Ben Beck, and in the soda fountain scene, Harry Morgan is the soda-jerk Cully Anderson, who also dates Connie Ward (Ann Rutherford), and Dale Evans plays Ann Rutherford's friend Hazel. Pat Friday dubbed Lynn Bari's singing, as she had done in Sun Valley Serenade. George Montgomery's on-screen trumpet playing was actually performed on the soundtrack by Miller sideman Johnny Best. Glenn Miller Orchestra pianist Chummy MacGregor dubbed Cesar Romero's playing.

Harry Morgan would co-star in the film The Glenn Miller Story in 1953, portraying MacGregor.

Award nominations
Academy Awards
 Nominated: Best Music, Original Song, "I've Got a Gal in Kalamazoo", Harry Warren (music), Mack Gordon (lyrics) (1943)

Production notes
 Production Dates: 6 April-17 April; 22 April-early June 1942
 The working title of this film was 'Orchestra Wife'.
 Information in the MPAA/PCA Collection at the AMPAS Library indicates that an early draft of the film's screenplay was rejected by the PCA because it implied that some of the characters had committed adultery. After PCA officials met with producer William LeBaron in mid-June 1942, the story was approved on the condition that there would be no adultery depicted.
 'Orchestra Wives' was the second and final film made by famed band leader Glenn Miller, who, in September 1942, disbanded his orchestra in order to enter the military.
 An July 8, 1942 Variety news item reported that the song "At Last," composed by Mack Gordon and Harry Warren, had originally been recorded by Miller and his orchestra for the 1941 Twentieth Century-Fox film Sun Valley Serenade.
 Studio records indicate that the Gordon and Warren song "That's Sabotage" was recorded for Orchestra Wives and was included on the soundtrack album, even though it does not appear in the completed picture.
 Instrumental versions of "You Say The Sweetest Things, Baby" and "The Darktown Strutters' Ball" were also to have been recorded for the film, but were cut.

In popular culture
A brief clip of The Nicholas Brothers performing "Kalamazoo" appears on a monitor in the 2019 film Ad Astra.

See also
 Kalamazoo, Michigan
 List of American films of 1942

References

External links
 
 
 
 
 

1942 films
1942 musical films
20th Century Fox films
American musical films
American black-and-white films
Films about music and musicians
Films directed by Archie Mayo
1940s English-language films
1940s American films